John David Guise Cannan (born 20 February 1954) is a British murderer, serial rapist, serial abductor and suspected serial killer. A former car salesman, Cannan was convicted in July 1988 of murder and multiple sexual offences, abductions and attempted abductions. He was given three life sentences for the murder of Shirley Banks in Bristol in October 1987; the attempted kidnapping of Julia Holman on the previous night; the rape of a woman in Reading, Berkshire, in 1986; the rape of his girlfriend in December 1980; and several other abductions, attempted abductions and sexual offences. He became eligible for parole in October 2022 and had a parole hearing the following month, the results of which are not yet known.

Cannan is the only suspect in the disappearance of Suzy Lamplugh, who had an appointment in July 1986 to meet a man calling himself 'Mr Kipper' and has not been seen since. In November 2002, the Crown Prosecution Service decided that there was insufficient evidence to charge him. That month Scotland Yard held a press conference at which, in a rare move, officers named Cannan as the man they believed murdered Lamplugh. Cannan says he knows who killed Lamplugh, and states that this person is the same person responsible for the murder of Shirley Banks, of which he himself was convicted. DNA evidence showed Lamplugh had previously been in a car Cannan owned at the time of her disappearance.

Early life
John David Guise Cannan was born in Sutton Coldfield, Birmingham, on 20 February 1954. He was sent by his parents to Keyse private school for boys at age 4. He has said that, when he was aged around 7 or 8, a teacher sexually abused him, forcing him to drop his trousers and touch the abuser while being indecently assaulted himself; he continued to be abused by the teacher for months. These events had a lasting effect on Cannan, who felt deeply ashamed by them, and he became afraid of school and developed a stammer from being nervous in the school environment.

At age 9, Cannan was removed from the school and his mother took him to a doctor over his anxiety. Cannan later claimed that the sexual abuse left him struggling with feelings of humiliation and shame, which in turn led him to express much anger and resentment. Cannan also had a difficult relationship with his father, "who was quick to criticise and had an unpredictable temper."

Sexual offences and robberies
In 1968, at age 14, Cannan indecently assaulted a woman in a phone box in Erdington, for which he was placed on probation. He married his first wife, June Vale, in May 1978, seven years after they had originally become engaged. She would prove to be his one and only steady girlfriend, although he claimed that he was hassled into marrying her. Vale soon gave birth to a child, which Cannan did not want. By 1980, he had slipped into alcoholism and spent much of his time frequenting bars and nightclubs in order to avoid going home to his family after work.

The "House for sale rapist"
During the late 1970s and into 1980, during the final years of Cannan's troubled marriage, a series of mysterious rapes occurred in homes for sale in the West Midlands, where he was living at that time. The unidentified rapist specifically targeted homes on the market at estate agents, and became known as the "house for sale rapist". Twenty women were assaulted and raped in properties in the area, and no one was ever arrested for the crimes. 

Police now suspect that Cannan was responsible for these offences, and that he began committing them as his marriage had begun to deteriorate. The rapes stopped in early 1980 when Cannan began a new relationship with a woman named Sharon Major. 

Detectives would later note that the offences bore all the hallmarks of his later crimes and also noted the similarities to the disappearance of Suzy Lamplugh, who herself was an estate agent. Notably, Cannan had shown up uninvited to a house that was for sale in Shorrolds Road in Fulham days before Lamplugh was last seen there, believing that the young female occupant was alone in the house. He started acting strangely until the woman's husband appeared, causing him to quickly leave.

1980–1987
Cannan left his wife in 1980 for Sharon Major, whom he attacked when she tried to leave him. After turning up at her house on New Year's Eve with a bottle of wine, he strangled her during sex while telling her he was going to kill her, and also brought a gun to the house. Major was able to fight Cannan off and was taken to hospital in an ambulance. Cannan told her on the way to the hospital that he had meant to kill her.

Cannan robbed a petrol station kiosk in February 1981, using a knife to threaten two female assistants. In March that year, during a robbery at a ladies' knitwear shop, Cannan raped Jean Bradford at knifepoint; he tied up her mother and raped Bradford in front of her, after threatening to stab her 17-month old baby. At Birmingham Crown Court on 26 June 1981, after pleading guilty, Cannan was sentenced to five years imprisonment for raping Bradford and a consecutive three years for two counts of robbery. He served five years of his eight-year sentence. Cannan served his sentence at HM Prison Bristol before being transferred to Portland, Dorset, and then to London. From 25 January 1986, until the end of his sentence in July, he was serving his sentence in open prison conditions in a prison hostel at Wormwood Scrubs, meaning he was on day release at the time of the murder of Sandra Court in Bournemouth in May and in the lead up to the disappearance of Suzy Lamplugh in July of that year. He attempted suicide in September by taking 68 paracetamol tablets.

Police say that Cannan's modus operandi was to pretend to be a West Country businessman. He would ply women with chocolates and flowers and then attack when the women rejected him. During 1986-87, Cannan had an affair with his solicitor; he threatened her and her family.

Only ten weeks after his release from prison, Cannan raped a woman at knifepoint in Reading in October 1986, an attack he was linked to by DNA from semen. Cannan had come up to the woman's car asking for directions, then brandished a knife and raped and sodomised her. Cannan had been arrested for this offence earlier but denied everything and gave an alibi that he was in Sutton Coldfield at the time of the attack, and the forensic evidence was not strong enough to charge him. An early DNA profile test was inconclusive. In 1988, as part of the garnering of evidence about Cannan for the investigation into the murder of Shirley Banks, the Home Office ran the DNA test again, by which time the DNA testing technology had improved and it demonstrated a match. Further DNA testing by ICI laboratories also found a match: they had been asked to run the tests because they had more sophisticated DNA testing equipment. Police also used evidence from Cannan's cashpoint card to prove that he had travelled from London to Bristol that day. Reading is on the railway line between these cities.

In September 1987, Cannan signed up for a video-dating agency, giving the fake name of John Peterson. An HTV West news report in 1989 said that Cannan's dating video had received a high response from other daters. A different source states that the video was not released to other daters.

The following month (October 1987), Cannan tried to abduct 30-year-old Bristol businesswoman Julia Holman from a car park at around 6.50 pm at gunpoint, but she fought him off and later identified him as her attacker. The next night he abducted Shirley Banks.

Murder of Shirley Banks

Disappearance
Banks, who was a newly married 29-year-old textiles factory manager from Clifton, was abducted on the evening of 8 October 1987 some time after 7.40 pm while out on a shopping trip to the Broadmead centre. Her husband Richard, then 30, searched for her in bars when she failed to return home, as they had agreed to meet for a drink; when he rang her work the next morning, he was told she had just phoned in sick with an upset stomach 15 minutes earlier. When she again failed to return home, he called the police. Police believe that Banks was held overnight in Cannan's flat and that he then persuaded her to phone in sick to her work, after pretending he was going to release her.

Investigation
150 officers from five police forces spent around 140,000 man-hours on the case. The police put out television appeals and searched Bristol Docks for Banks's car. They considered that the telephone call to her work could mean she had left voluntarily and also considered whether her husband Richard could be a suspect; he was quickly eliminated. The police had first planned to link the attempted abduction of Julia Holman the previous night on a Crimewatch reconstruction in November, before Cannan's further crimes led to his arrest.

Arrest of Cannan
Cannan, then living at Foye House, Leigh Woods, Bristol, was arrested on 29 October 1987 in Leamington Spa for an assault at knife-point on an assistant at a Regent Street dress shop, Ginger. Two passers-by had chased him and called the police. He evaded them briefly and they found a knife and bag with blood on it. The police spotted him and saw his hand was bleeding, then arrested him. Near to the shop, they found his black BMW car, which contained rope and an imitation handgun; they also found rope hidden in a toilet cistern in a garage.

Link to Banks

The police searched his car three weeks after Banks had disappeared, where they found a tax disc for her car, inside a briefcase in the glove compartment. Her orange Mini Clubman was found, painted blue, in the lock-up garage at his block of flats. The police bailed him from the station in Warwick, where he was being interviewed for the attempted robbery, and police from Bristol immediately rearrested him regarding Banks's disappearance.

News media immediately linked Banks's disappearance to that of Suzy Lamplugh and published Cannan's prior criminal record. Cannan claimed he had bought the Mini from a man at an auction. The police charged him with assault on 2 November and he had no alibi for the night of Banks's disappearance.

Witnesses
A taxi driver came forward to say that a woman had called a taxi to Cannan's flat at about 2 pm on the day after Banks disappeared, but Cannan told him nobody had called one. At about 2.30 pm, he borrowed a vacuum cleaner from a neighbour and was seen cleaning his car. Cannan's movements could not be accounted for between 3 pm and 7 pm. Police brought in Julia Holman, whom he had attempted to abduct, and she immediately identified him in the line up.

Hoping that Banks was still alive, the police released Cannan's picture to the press. A 69-year-old woman came forward to say she was in traffic near Cannan's flat on 9 October 1987 and saw smoke from a small fire in a copse. In the woods she heard a struggle, punching, a woman saying "No, no" and a man saying "I warned you what I would do". There was also a choking sound.

She shouted towards the man with "dark, curly hair" who saw her, ran towards her and lunged at her. The police were sceptical but believed that it was possible she had heard and seen something in the woods.

Forensics
Police found a cleaning ticket for a shop in Sutton Coldfield and found that Cannan had dropped off a raincoat with red marks on it in late October. He claimed the marks were due to red mud from making love in a park; police found the marks were bloodstains, that could have been from the same blood group as Banks.

The police built up a composite set of Banks's fingerprints from her parents' house, her home and her work. The left thumbprint matched a document in Cannan's flat. He acknowledged that the document came from his flat, before he knew about the thumbprint. He was charged with her kidnap and murder on 23 December 1987.

Discovery of her body
Banks's naked, moss-covered decomposed body was found in a stream by a woman, six months after her disappearance, on Easter Sunday (3 April 1988) in the Quantock hills, at a site named "Dead Woman's Ditch", part of an Iron Age camp at Dowsborough.

The police found dark red mud at the site where her body was left, gold jewellery and buttons from a dress she had bought. According to pathologist Bernard Knight, she was killed by being hit repeatedly on the head with a rock.

Trial

Cannan's trial began on 5 April 1989, when he was charged with the murder of Banks, and a further eight charges including "rape, buggery, kidnap, attempted abduction, indecent assault and abduction for sex."
The trial lasted three weeks. After ten hours of deliberation on 28 April 1989, the jury found Cannan guilty of all charges: the abduction and murder of Banks, the rape and buggery of a Reading woman, and the attempted kidnap at gunpoint of Holman. He was jailed for life by Mr Justice Drake at Exeter Crown Court. Drake praised the investigation led by Detective Chief Inspector Brian Saunders.

Suspected cases

John Cannan was a person of interest in the disappearance of 25-year-old estate agent Suzy Lamplugh in July 1986 and the murder of 27-year-old insurance clerk Sandra Court by strangulation, in Bournemouth, in May 1986 but he has never been charged in either case.

Murder of Sandra Court
In November 2001, Police interviewed Cannan at a police station in York over the murder of Sandra Court in May 1986. Court had been dropped off by a taxi driver in Throop, Dorset, near her sister's house after a night out, but her sister was not at home. She was last seen walking barefoot, appearing slightly drunk, at around 2:45 am. Court's body was found the next day in a water-filled ditch near the River Avon several miles away. A pay-and-display ticket proves that Cannan was in Bournemouth the day she was killed.

Court had been killed by strangulation. Ten days after the discovery of Court's body, an anonymous letter was sent to police from Southampton. The letter said the death was "an accident" and that the killer was "truly sorry".  It further said that "the person concerned is deeply unhappy, hurt and in total shock" and that "the only reason the person has not come forward is the fact of being afraid that their explanation will not be believed".

Although an attempt had been made to disguise it, the handwriting style bore clear similarities with the handwriting of John Cannan. In 2007, crime writers Christopher Berry-Dee and Robin Odell, while writing a book on John Cannan, handed police letters they had received from Cannan from prison, which gave them a means of comparison to the original letter they had received. The police found them so useful that they refused to return them to the authors when requested. When interviewed, Cannan denied having ever been to Bournemouth on the day in question, but was proved to be lying through the parking tickets discovered by police.

Disappearance of Suzy Lamplugh 

Cannan was questioned by police regarding the disappearance of Suzy Lamplugh in 1989 and 1990. He wrote a letter to the local paper, Sutton News, in August 1991 denying any part in her disappearance. She was officially declared dead in absentia in July 1993. In December 2000 John Cannan was arrested for Lamplugh's murder and questioned, but he was not charged. In November 2002, detectives said publicly that they believed he had killed Lamplugh and confirmed this in 2006 when arguing against any reduction in his tariff.

In November 2002, Cannan complained via his solicitors about the police publicly naming him, saying he was "devastated and distressed". He again denied killing Lamplugh. His solicitor complained about a lack of presumption of innocence and that the prison service had withheld letters Cannan had tried to send to national newspapers regarding the allegations.

In November 2002, Mark Dennis, a senior Treasury counsel, decided that there was insufficient evidence to charge Cannan over Ms Lamplugh's death. Lamplugh's parents considered, but decided against, bringing a private prosecution and civil action against Cannan. In July 1993, The Independent argued that the judge's sentencing statement, that Cannan should remain in prison for the rest of his natural life, removed any incentive for him to confess post-conviction.

Evidence
In November 2002, the police said that Cannan should have been a suspect much earlier in the investigation: they should have checked for recently released sex offenders and they should have followed up information given by her parents about a man from Bristol.

Cannan was released from his prison hostel three days before Lamplugh disappeared. His colleagues said he often went to wine bars in Fulham, where Lamplugh worked. Lamplugh was supposed to meet a "Mr Kipper" when she disappeared and Cannan was said to have used the name "Kipper" in prison. In 2000, a new investigating team, led by Jim Dickie, computerised the card index of the case and found that several estate agents in Fulham had been visited by a Mr Kipper. Cannan may have had access to a black BMW and a dark BMW was linked to Ms Lamplugh's kidnap; Lamplugh was last seen getting into a BMW with a man holding champagne, which led an ex-girlfriend of Cannan, Daphne Sargent, to say that "As soon as I heard about Suzy, I knew it was John. It had all the hallmarks – right down to the champagne." Cannan resembles a photofit of a man seen with Lamplugh the day she disappeared. A girlfriend of Cannan said he had "a strong interest" in the case, and police believe Lamplugh may have been in a relationship with Cannan.

In 2007, a criminologist who had corresponded with Cannan revealed that the police re-investigations of 2000–2002 had discovered DNA evidence in a car previously owned by Cannan that showed Lamplugh had previously been inside the vehicle. The criminologist had pointed out to police that Cannan had access to a red Ford Fiesta at the time Lamplugh disappeared, which police were previously unaware of. Detectives subsequently attempted to find the car and discovered it in a scrap yard, before they conducted the DNA analysis on it. Although these tests indicated Lamplugh had been in the car, as well as Cannan, the Crown Prosecution Service felt there was insufficient evidence to prove that they had been in the vehicle at the same time, meaning charges were unable to be brought against Cannan for her murder.

In April 2001, police said that the number plate SLP 386S had been placed on Banks' Mini by Cannan and that 386 might be a grid reference, as the site Banks' body was found is near Northing Line 386 and Norton Manor Barracks is near 3° 08' 06" West. When the police interviewed Cannan about the significance of the number plate on the Mini, he acknowledged that the initials could stand for Suzy Lamplugh but said a "Bristol businessman" from whom he bought the car for £100 was responsible for the deaths of Lamplugh, Banks and another woman. Asked if that businessman was him, he replied "Yes", but then immediately recanted. Cannan allegedly told an astrologer who visited him in jail that "a Bristol businessman" murdered Lamplugh and that "I know who killed Shirley, Suzy and another girl".

Possible burial sites
Cannan's ex-girlfriend Gilly Paige told police, as early as 1990, that he had said Lamplugh's body was buried at Norton Barracks, although she later retracted the assertion. In December 1999, after a letter was sent to Lamplugh's mother, Diana, claiming Suzy was buried there, a five-day search by more than 30 officers in and around the former site of the barracks, in December 2000, failed to find her body.

In February 2001, the Metropolitan Police searched the barracks site again. In April 2001, the police realised that it was possible the barracks named were actually Norton Manor Royal Marines barracks in Somerset, 8 miles from where Banks' body was found.

In August 2010, they searched a field three miles from the site in Worcestershire after a witness remembered seeing a mound of earth there in 1986, when he was a teenager. The police used ground-penetrating radar, and trenches were dug by the side of the road between Pershore and Drakes Broughton, Worcestershire. At the same time they also searched woodland in the Quantock Hills, where Shirley Banks' body was found.

In April 2001, a cellmate of Cannan said that Lamplugh was buried under the patio of Cannan's mother's house in Sutton Coldfield. In October 2018, police officers returned to the house and dug up the garden.

Prison life
Cannan is a Category A offender in HMP Full Sutton, York. He still protests his innocence. He has studied for an Open University degree while in prison. His minimum tariff is 35 years, meaning he did not become eligible for parole until October 2022, and he will be released only if the Parole Board rules that he is no longer a serious danger to the public. Cannan himself has previously suggested that he may confess to the murder of Lamplugh only when his mother dies, to avoid causing her further grief. An anonymous relative of Cannan's has also stated a belief that he will confess when his mother dies. Cannan and his mother remained close after his conviction and she continued to visit him every week.

In August 2016, Cannan wrote a letter to prisoners' newspaper Inside Time saying that prisoners should be given the vote. In August 2017, he sent another letter to the newspaper from prison, describing how he had written to Secretary of State for Justice David Lidington asking him to stop the implementation of a smoking ban in all English prisons. He said that his request should be granted "to allow fresh ideas, arguments and evidence from staff and inmates to be placed before him for his consideration" and added "I believe a delay would permit a wiser and more thoughtful consideration of its rationale". The smoking ban was implemented despite Cannan's objections.

Legal action
In July 1989, he failed to persuade the High Court to stop the BBC broadcasting a Crimewatch UK documentary on the investigation into the murder of Banks. A case he took to the High Court in January 2003, claiming that his right to "free and unimpeded" legal advice was being restricted, failed.

In June 2009, he lodged another case at the High Court for alleged human rights breaches; he claimed that his ineligibility for a sexual offences treatment programme, due to his continued claim of innocence, was illegal.

He appealed for his 35-year minimum tariff to be reduced, but Mr Justice Coulson ruled against this in June 2008 because his crimes involved "a significant degree of planning and premeditation" and there were "no real mitigating factors at all".

Personal life
Cannan came from a middle-class family, the son of an engineer, and attended public school until the age of 15. He was originally from Sutton Coldfield in the West Midlands. He was in the merchant navy for three months aged 17 then began working as a car salesman in his father's company. When he was on day release from Wormwood Scrubs, he worked as a porter for a prop hire company.

He claimed to have had 100 one-night stands and was said to be charming. He was married in May 1978 to June Vale and had a daughter, but he left them in 1980. In June 2022, it was reported that Cannan was on his deathbed and receiving palliative care.

References

Further reading

1954 births
20th-century British criminals
English people convicted of indecent assault
British people convicted of robbery
Crime in Bristol
English people convicted of murder
English people convicted of rape
Living people
People from Sutton Coldfield
Place of birth missing (living people)
Salespeople
Suspected serial killers